Jeffrey Chuan Chu (朱傳榘) (July 14, 1919 – June 6, 2011), born in Tianjin, Republic of China, was a pioneer computer engineer. He received his BS from the University of Minnesota and his MS from the Moore School at the University of Pennsylvania. Chuan was a member of the engineering team that designed the first American electronic computer, the ENIAC. ENIAC was designed by John Mauchly and J. Presper Eckert of the University of Pennsylvania, U.S.

As a Senior Scientist at Argonne National Laboratory, he helped design several improved versions of early large-scale computers such as AVIDAC and ORACLE. The first IEEE Computer Society Computer Pioneer Award was awarded to him in 1981.

References

External links 
  Jeffrey Chuan Chu Obituary, Boston Globe, 2011
  Jeffrey Chuan Chu 朱傳榘

1919 births
2011 deaths
Chinese computer scientists
Scientists from Tianjin
University of Minnesota alumni
University of Pennsylvania School of Engineering and Applied Science alumni